Mudukulathur is a legislative assembly constituency in Ramanathapuram district the Indian state of Tamil Nadu. It is a component of Ramanathapuram Lok sabha constituency. It is one of the 234 State Legislative Assembly Constituencies in Tamil Nadu, in India.

Elections and winners in the constituency are listed below.

Madras State

Tamil Nadu

Election Results

2021

2016

2011

2006

2001

1996

1991

1989

1984

1980

1977

1971

1967

1962

1957

1952

References 

 

Assembly constituencies of Tamil Nadu
Ramanathapuram district